Zameen Se Aassman Tak is a Hindi-language television series on Sahara One. The series follow the story of a family who gets separated by a natural disaster, Earthquake. The series was produced by Aruna Irani.

Premise
The story is of the main protagonist, Balraj Thakur, who gets separated from his wife and daughter in an earthquake tragedy. He tries to find them but can not, and subsequently marries another woman, Meera. The troubles for Balraj Thakur arise when he happens to bump into his real wife one day.

Cast
 Aruna Irani
 Kiran Kumar as Balraj Thakur
 Jividha Sharma / Sangeeta Ghosh
 Anand Suryavanshi
 Sudha Chandran as Meera Balraj Thakur
 Dharmesh Vyas
 Nupur Alankar
 Yash Sinha
 Satyen Kappu
 Rajeev Paul
 Rajeev Verma
 Pooja Gandhi
 Hansika Motwani
 Ravee Gupta

References

Sahara One original programming
Indian television soap operas
Indian drama television series